Arthur Milner (born July 3, 1950) is a Canadian playwright, theatre director, and journalist.

Early life and career
Milner was born in Germany. His parents were Polish Jews who survived World War II by escaping to Russia. After several years in Displaced Persons Camp, the family emigrated to Montreal in 1951. He is the brother of political scientist .

Milner was a student at Carleton University in Ottawa when friends and colleagues founded the Great Canadian Theatre Company(GCTC) in 1975. He soon joined GCTC as an actor and Board member. He was appointed resident playwright in 1984 and Artistic Director in 1991. He was elected president of the Professional Association of Canadian Theatres in 1993. He has worked as a dramaturge at the Banff Playwrights Colony, the Manitoba Association of Playwrights, and Playwrights Workshop Montréal. He has taught at Concordia University, Carleton University, Algonquin College, the National Theatre School in Montreal. Recently, he taught courses in political theatre at the University of Calgary and the University of Regina.

He has directed his own work as well as Criminals in Love by George F. Walker; Odd Fish by Pamela Boyd; Stephen and Mr. Wilde by Jim Bartley; Brothers of the Brush by Jimmy Murphy; Bedtime Story by Seán O’Casey; The London Vertigo by Brian Friel; Our Country’s Good by Timberlake Wertenbaker; On the Razzle by Tom Stoppard; and, in 2014, the world premiere of George F. Walker’s The Burden of Self-Awareness. Since its founding in 1992, he has written on arts and politics for Inroads, the Canadian Journal of Opinion.

He holds a Bachelor of Arts in English, Carleton University (1975); and a Master of Arts in English and Cultural Studies, Carleton University (2002) — Thesis: “Political Theatre, Modernist Marxism, and the Avant-Garde”; Thesis Advisor: Paul Keen

Milner now lives in Regina, Saskatchewan, where his wife, Jennifer Brewin, is Artistic Director of Globe Theatre.

Playwriting career
Milner joined GCTC as an actor but soon turned to writing plays. His first plays were adaptations of novels for children. He then worked on several collective creations, including Sandinista! which opened in Ottawa in 1982 and toured Canada. He was appointed resident playwright in 1984 and wrote a new play for GCTC every year until his appointment as Artistic Director in 1991. He has also been commissioned to write plays for Edmonton’s Workshop West Playwrights’ Theatre, Vancouver’s Green Thumb Theatre, the Canadian Broadcasting Corporation, the Canadian Union of Public Employees and the Caravan Farm Theatre.

His play Facts, a murder mystery set in the Palestinian West Bank, premiered at GCTC in 2010 and was subsequently produced in Toronto and Vancouver; in London, U.K. (Time Out Critic’s Choice), and in Istanbul (in Turkish); and for a 9-city tour through Palestine and Israel (in Arabic). Getting to Room Temperature — a one-person play about Milner’s mother’s polite quest for assisted suicide — toured for several years after it premiered at Ottawa’s Undercurrents Festival in 2016. In February 2022 it was produced by Regina based theatre company Curtain Razors with the use of innovative teleprompter technology.

Awards and honours
Milner is the recipient of numerous awards from the Canada Council for the Arts, the Ontario Arts Council, and the City of Ottawa. He has been awarded an Honorary Membership by the Canadian Association for Theatre Research (1998); the Victor Tolgesy Award for Contribution to the Arts in Ottawa (1993); and a Canada 125 Medal.

Major works
 Sandinista! (Collective) — 1982
 1997 — 1984
 Cheap Thrill — 1985
 Zero Hour — 1986
 Learning to Live with Personal Growth — 1987
 The City — 1990
 Sisters in the Great Day Care War — 1990
 Masada — 1991
 It’s Not a Country, It’s Winter — 1998
 Crusader of the World — 1999
 Joan Henry: The Musical (with Allen Cole and Estelle Shook) — 2003
 Facts — 2010
 The Vicar of Dibley (Adaptation) — 2015
 Getting to Room Temperature — 2016

Works about Arthur Milner
 Samer Al-Saber, “Arabic Facts in Palestine: Clashing Hybridities in Transnational Cultural Production.” Theatre Research in Canada, https://journals.lib.unb.ca/index.php/TRIC/article/view/22392
 Aaron Ellis, “Arthur Milner, Two Plays about Israel/Palestine: Masada/Facts,” Journal of Jewish Ethics, Vol. 3, No. 2 (2017), pp. 276–279, Penn State University Press, https://www.jstor.org/stable/10.5325/jjewiethi.3.2.0276

References

External links
 "Arthur Milner", Canadian Theatre Encyclopedia, http://www.canadiantheatre.com/dict.pl?term=Milner%2C%20Arthur
 "Arthur Milner", Marquis Literary, https://mqlit.ca/playwrights/arthur-milner/
 "Arthur Milner", Playwrights Guild of Canada, https://playwrightsguild.ca/paupress/profile/3284/view/
 "Great Canadian Theatre Company", Canadian Theatre Encyclopedia, http://www.canadiantheatre.com/dict.pl?term=Great%20Canadian%20Theatre%20Company
 "Arthur Milner", Encyclopedia of Literature in Canada https://books.google.ca/books?id=Mkh2vJ_9GpEC&pg=PA306&lpg=PA306&dq=%22arthur+milner%22+encyclopedia&source=bl&ots=bgfe0Qy-yR&sig=bGiDF_d5gqRgvnyADUOe7pn-5Tk&hl=en&sa=X&ved=0ahUKEwiqo9qfweLPAhXIHR4KHUExDBsQ6AEIOTAF#v=onepage&q=%22arthur%20milner%22%20encyclopedia&f=false
 "Interview with FACTS playwright Arthur Milner", Review Vancouver, http://www.reviewvancouver.org/th_arthur_milner2014.htm
 Facts Review, Time Out, March 1, 2013, “A Deservedly Brilliant UK Premiere”; http://www.timeout.com/london/theatre/facts
 Facts Review, Countercurrents, “The Masterly Intellectual Gravitas of Milner’s Unflinching...”; Dr Vacy Vlazna, https://countercurrents.org/2017/03/double-exposure-plays-of-the-jewish-and-palestinian-diasporas

1950 births
Living people
Canadian male dramatists and playwrights
Polish refugees
Polish emigrants to Canada
Jewish Canadian writers
Polish expatriates in Germany
Canadian people of Polish-Jewish descent
Canadian male stage actors
Carleton University alumni
20th-century Canadian male actors
20th-century Canadian dramatists and playwrights
21st-century Canadian dramatists and playwrights
20th-century Canadian male writers
21st-century Canadian male writers